The predicted impact point (PIP) is the location that a ballistic projectile (e.g. bomb, missile, bullet) is expected to strike if fired. The PIP is almost always actively determined by a targeting computer, which then projects a PIP marker (a "pipper") onto a Head-Up Display (HUD). Modern HUDs are focused so the weapon operator will see the marker projected directly over the point of impact, regardless of the position of their eye.

Modern combat aircraft are equipped to calculate the PIP for onboard weapons at any given time. Using the PIP marker, pilots can achieve good accuracy at ranges of up to several kilometers, whether the target is ground-based or airborne. Variables included in the calculation are aircraft velocity, target velocity, target elevation, distance to target, forces on the projectile (drag, gravity), and others.

Another example of devices that show the PIP are red dot sights like the M68 Aimpoint. Such sights, like on a HUD's, are collimated reflector sights, so the dot always appears over the weapon's impact point, regardless of the shooter's eye position. Red dot sights do not use internal computers and must be manually zeroed for maximum accuracy.

See also
 Fire-control system

Weapon guidance